Sondel is a village in De Fryske Marren municipality in the province of Friesland, the Netherlands. It had a population of around 410 in 2017.

History
The village was first mentioned in 1422 Syndele. The etymologie is not clear. Sondel developed on a sandy ridge during the 12th or 13th century, and had both a water and road connection to the Zuiderzee (nowadays: IJsselmeer). The Dutch Reformed Church was built in 1870 as a replacement of a medieval church and has a 14th century bell. In 1840, Sondel was home to 239 people. In 1942, a radar installation was built near Sondel by the German occupiers, and consists of sixteen partially submerged barracks. Nowadays, it is in use as a recreational site.

Before 2014, Sondel was part of the Gaasterlân-Sleat municipality and before 1984 it was part of Gaasterland.

Gallery

References

External links

De Fryske Marren
Populated places in Friesland